The canthus is either corner of the eye where the upper and lower eyelids meet.

Canthus may also refer to:
 Canthus of the eye, also called the orbital canthus
 Canthus (herpetology), the sides of the snout in reptiles in amphibians
 Canthus (mythology), one of the Argonauts
 Canthus (crater), a geographical feature on Phoebe